Frank Gallagher may refer to:

 Frank Gallagher (actor) (born 1962), Scottish actor
 Frank Gallagher (American football) (born 1943), professional American football player
 Frank Gallagher (author) (1893–1962), Irish journalist, editor
 Frank Gallagher (Brooklyn) (1870–1932), New York politician
 Frank Gallagher (rugby league) (died 1966), rugby league footballer of the 1920s for Great Britain, England, Yorkshire, Dewsbury, Batley, and Leeds
 Frank T. Gallagher (1887–1977), American jurist
 Frankie Gallagher, Northern Irish politician
 Frank Gallagher (Shameless), a fictional character in the British TV series Shameless